This list is of the Cultural Properties of Japan designated in the category of  for the Prefecture of Kumamoto.

National Cultural Properties
As of 1 February 2015, four Important Cultural Properties have been designated, being of national significance.

Prefectural Cultural Properties
Properties designated at a prefectural level include:

See also
 Cultural Properties of Japan
 List of National Treasures of Japan (archaeological materials)
 List of Historic Sites of Japan (Kumamoto)
 List of Cultural Properties of Japan - historical materials (Kumamoto)
 Higo Province

References

History of Kumamoto Prefecture
Archaeological materials, Kumamoto
Kumamoto,Cultural Properties